Henriette Ekwe Ebongo (December 25, 1949) is a Cameroonian journalist, publisher and political activist. She was awarded the International Women of Courage Award in 2011.

Ebongo advocates freedom of press, gender equality, human rights, and good governance. She was active in the struggle against dictatorship in the 1980s, and the current campaign against government corruption, gender discrimination and human rights abuses. During this time she has suffered repression, torture, and being taken to military court.

She is the publisher of the independent weekly newspaper Babela and is a founder of the Cameroon branch of Transparency International, the anti-corruption non-governmental organization.

References

External links
 US Department of State website

1950 births
Living people
Cameroonian activists
Cameroonian journalists
Cameroonian women journalists
Recipients of the International Women of Courage Award